Prom Night may refer to:

 Prom, a dance party of high school students
 Prom Night (film series), a Canadian horror film franchise of five films
 Prom Night (1980 film), starring Jamie Lee Curtis and Leslie Nielsen
Prom Night: Original Soundtrack from the Motion Picture, a soundtrack album
 Prom Night (2008 film), a loose remake of the 1980 film, starring Brittany Snow and Idris Elba
 "Prom Night" (That '70s Show), an episode of the American comedy
 "Prom Night" (Full House), an episode of the American sitcom
 "Prom Night!", an episode of the American TV series Supergirl
 "Prom Night", a song by Anamanaguchi from the 2013 album Endless Fantasy
 "Prom Night", a 2012 song by Jeffree Star
 Prom Night (Ireland), a humorous reference to the 2013 liquidation of the Irish Bank Resolution Corporation

See also 

Prom (disambiguation)